C/2011 J2 (LINEAR) is an Oort cloud comet discovered on 4 May 2011 by LINEAR at an apparent magnitude of 19.7 using a  Reflecting telescope. As of September 2014 the comet is around apparent magnitude 17.

C/2011 J2 came to perihelion (closest approach to the Sun) on 25 December 2013 at a distance of 3.4 AU from the Sun. On 27 August 2014 an 18th magnitude fragment CK11J02b was detected. Preliminary estimates are that a fragmentation event occurred around 14 July 2014 plus/minus ten days. In mid-July 2014 the comet was 3.9 AU from the Sun.

Fragment C was detected in October 2014 by Ernesto Guido, Nick Howes, and Martino Nicolini.

C/2011 J2 is dynamically new. It came from the Oort cloud with a loosely bound chaotic orbit that was easily perturbed by galactic tides and passing stars. Before entering the planetary region (epoch 1950), C/2011 J2 had an orbital period of several million years. After leaving the planetary region (epoch 2050), it will be on an ejection trajectory.

References

External links 
C/2011 J2 ( LINEAR ) – Seiichi Yoshida's Comet Catalog
C/2011 J2 Linear: nucleus splitting (Virtual Telescope 19 September 2014)
Comet C/2011 J2 in the process of fragmenting as seen on 2 September 2014
Comet C/2011 J2 Linear splitting: a new image (24 Sept. 2014) (Virtual Telescope 25 September 2014)
Follow-up of splitting event in Comet C/2011 J2 (Remanzacco 1 October 2014)

20110504
20131225
Non-periodic comets
Oort cloud